Incubus is a 2006 horror thriller film by Sony Pictures Home Entertainment that was directed by Anya Camilleri and stars actress Tara Reid. The film was released on May 3, 2006 and had an internet premiere on AOL during Halloween 2006. An unrated version was released to DVD on February 6, 2007. The film has billed itself as the first Download To Own video.

Plot 
Seeking refuge from a torrential storm, Jay, her brother, and three friends break into what they think is an abandoned recycling plant. (A fourth friend, Karen, decides not to enter the building and leaves.) They find two dead people, who appear to have killed each other, and a Sleeper – a coma patient hooked up to life support in a triple-locked, shatterproof observation room. Closer examination reveals a disturbing truth: the Sleeper is Orin Kiefer, a murderer executed by lethal injection six years earlier.

Jay, her brother and friends search for a way out of the factory. A psychopathic man roaming the building attacks and kills her brother.

When Peter falls asleep, his dreams are invaded and his mind is controlled by the comatose madman. The madman turns Peter into a deranged killer like himself, and he tries to attack Jay and the remaining friends, but they make it safely to the observation room and try to sort the situation out.

They discover that the Sleeper in the locked room possesses the power of an Incubus demon, and can invade and control another human's mind through their dreams. To test this theory, they tell Holly to go to sleep. She is the weakest of the three, and if she is infected like Peter she can at least be tied up and easily kept under control without being hurt. She agrees and eventually falls asleep.

Jay and Bug wait, not expecting anything to happen. After a few minutes, Holly wakes up and tries to attack Bug and Jay. They try to get her to snap out of the spell of the Incubus, but when they fail they realize that the only way to stop her is to kill her, which they do. Angry, disgusted, and scared, Bug turns and attacks the comatose madman, still peacefully sleeping and dreaming. He rips off the machinery that keeps him in his unconscious state. Bug and Jay run to get out of the factory.

Peter is still waiting for them, and Bug quickly attacks him with a hammer. As he dies, Peter reveals that he is no longer under the control of the Incubus. As it turns out, the reason he is no longer psychotic is that the Incubus is no longer asleep. Because the machinery keeping him comatose was destroyed, he was able to free himself, wake up, and kill. He kills Bug by snapping his neck, and then goes after Jay.

Jay tricks the Incubus by making it look as though she has managed to escape onto the factory's roof. After she kills him she makes the mistake of falling asleep and dreams of the Incubus. In the dream he manages to get inside of her and when she wakes up she is delirious.

As sheriffs arrive on the scene, they discover the dead Incubus and the bloody Jay. They wrongly assume she is a killer, though she does not say a single word. She is led into a police car, in handcuffs, past Karen, who is in another police car. The film ends with a brief shot of Jay's eyes, which suddenly exhibit an alarming expression. This reveals that she has become a psychopathic killer, possessed by the Incubus.

Cast 
 Tara Reid as Jay
 Akemnji Ndifornyen as Bug
 Alice O'Connell as Holly
 Russell Carter as Josh
 Christian Brassington as Peter
  Mihai Stanescu as Sleeper
 Monica Dean as Karen
 Mihai Gruia Sandu as Dr. Gregg
 Luana Stoica as Dr. Yousov
 Ioan Brancu as Crazy Man
 Dan Mason as The Sheriff
 Silviu Olteanu as The Deputy
 Martin Sherman as Orin Kiefer (uncredited)

Reception
Critical reception was predominantly negative and review aggregator Rotten Tomatoes hosts three reviews for Incubus, all negative. Dread Central, Entertainment Weekly, and DVD Talk all gave negative reviews for Incubus, all of whom heavily criticized Reid's acting in the film.

References

External links 
 
 

2006 horror films
2006 films
Films scored by Simon Boswell
Films produced by Donald Kushner
Demons in film
Demonic possession
Films about spirit possession